Graham Smith (born December 31, 1982 in Bermuda) is an international-level swimmer from Bermuda. As of June 2009, he holds the Bermuda Record in the long-course 400 IM.

He swam at the:
2002 Commonwealth Games (50 free; 50, 100 & 200 breaststrokes)
2003 Island Games
2005 World Championships (50 free; 50, 100 & 200 breaststroke; 100 fly; 200 IM)
2006 Commonwealth Games (100 free; 100 & 200 breaststroke; 200 IM)

References

1982 births
Living people
Bermudian male swimmers
Swimmers at the 2002 Commonwealth Games
Swimmers at the 2006 Commonwealth Games
Commonwealth Games competitors for Bermuda